"Lonely People" is  a song written by the husband-and-wife team of Dan Peek and Catherine Peek and recorded by America.

Background
"Lonely People" was the second single release from America's 1974 album Holiday.  "Lonely People" reached number five on the Billboard Hot 100, the Peeks' only credited song to reach that chart's top 10, and was America's second number one on the Easy Listening chart, where it stayed for one week in February 1975.

"Lonely People" was not automatically earmarked for the Holiday album: Dan Peek unsuccessfully submitted a demo of the song for John Sebastian to consider recording.

"Lonely People" was written as an optimistic response to the Beatles' song "Eleanor Rigby". Dan Peek considered "Eleanor Rigby" an "overwhelming" "picture...of the masses of lost humanity, drowning in grey oblivion" and would recall being "lacerated" on first hearing the lyrics of its chorus which run "All the lonely people: where do they all come from...where do they all belong". "Lonely People" was written within a few weeks of Dan Peek's 1973 marriage to Catherine Maberry: Peek- "I always felt like a melancholy, lonely person. And now [upon getting married] I felt like I’d won." The lyrics of "Lonely People" advise "all the lonely people": "Don't give up until you drink from the silver cup", a metaphor which Dan Peek thus explains: "It's possible to drink from another's well of experience...and be refreshed."

Record World described it as being " about solitude and salvation."

Dan Peek solo release
After Dan Peek left America in 1977, he recalled performing "Lonely People" to close his concerts, introducing the song "with words to the effect" "that Jesus is the answer to loneliness". On the advice of a fan, Peek rewrote the lyrics of the song to convey a pro-Christian message and he recorded a revised version of "Lonely People" for his 1986 album Electro-Voice. This version changed the original lyrics "And ride that highway in the sky" and "You never know until you try" to "And give your heart to Jesus Christ."  Peek's version was released as a single in 1986 and became a hit on contemporary Christian music stations.

Chart performance

America version

Dan Peek version

Other versions
Jars of Clay recorded "Lonely People" for their 2003 album Who We Are Instead.   Their version was featured on The WB TV series Everwood and was on the 2004 Everwood soundtrack album.

See also
List of number-one adult contemporary singles of 1975 (U.S.)

References

1974 songs
1974 singles
Songs written by Dan Peek
America (band) songs
Song recordings produced by George Martin
Warner Records singles
Songs about loneliness